San Valentino can refer to Saint Valentine, ancient Roman saint. 

It may also refer to several places of Italy:

 San Valentino in Abruzzo Citeriore, a municipality in the Province of Pescara, Abruzzo
 San Valentino Torio, a municipality in the Province of Salerno, Campania
 San Valentino, Sorano, a hamlet of Sorano (GR), Tuscany
 San Valentino alla Muta, a hamlet of Graun im Vinschgau (BZ), Trentino-South Tyrol
 San Valentino della Collina, a hamlet of Marsciano (PG), Umbria